Peter Riis Andersen (born 25 July 1980) is a Danish cyclist. He competed in the men's cross-country mountain biking event at the 2004 Summer Olympics.

References

External links

1980 births
Living people
Danish male cyclists
Olympic cyclists of Denmark
Cyclists at the 2004 Summer Olympics
Place of birth missing (living people)